Developmental Basketball League (DBL), previously named DetEksi Basketball League, is a basketball league for middle and high school students in Indonesia.

History 

DBL began in Surabaya in 2004. The league originated by Jawa Pos newspaper as a simple high school league. The DetEksi term of its original name came from a former teenager section of the paper.

A total of 96 teams joined in the first season, from cities throughout East Java. In 2007 more than 55,000 spectators watched games. This was a four-fold increase on 2004's figures, and a total of 220 teams competed. East Java DBL subsequently divided into two regions: North in Surabaya; and South in Malang. These included nine cities throughout nine provinces and five islands in Indonesia.

DBL began to foster international collaborations. The first official NBA event in Indonesia was held in Surabaya on 23–24 August 2008. NBA player Danny Granger of the Indiana Pacers ran a workshop training local players. Further in October 2008, DBL sent its first All-Star team (of both genders) to Perth, Australia to learn and play against select Western Australian teams.

In 2008 DBL opened a new basketball building, the DBL Arena, which was built in just seven months. It has a capacity of 5,000 spectators.

Eligibility 

Professional or semi-professional players are forbidden and sponsors cannot be in the business of tobacco, alcohol or energy drinks. Players must be student athletes and they are encouraged to value their performance in the classroom as much as their performance on the basketball court.

Loop 3x3 Basketball 

Boys

Girls

Medal table

External links 

 

Basketball leagues in Indonesia